P. J. Thomas may refer to:

P. J. Thomas, Parakunnel (1895-1965), Economist
P. J. Thomas, Polayil (b. 1951), Civil servant
P. J. Thomas (pastor) (1914-1998), Pentecostal pastor
P. J. Thomas (b. 1951), administrative officer from Kerala

See also
Thomas (surname)